LGHS may refer to:
 Lake Gibson High School, Lakeland, Florida, United States
 Leeds Girls' High School, Leeds, England
 Los Gatos High School, Los Gatos, California, United States
 Louisville Girls High School (Nigeria), Ijebu-Itele, Ogun State, Nigeria